Lorang may be,

Lorang language
Lorang Christiansen